Events in the year 2015 in Lithuania.

Incumbents
President: Dalia Grybauskaitė
Prime Minister: Algirdas Butkevičius

Events

January
1 January - Lithuania adopts the Euro and joins Eurozone.
1 January - first commercial operations in Klaipėda LNG FSRU.
1 January - National Cyber Security Centre of Lithuania was established.
1 January - Suicide Prevention Centre of Lithuania was established.
15 January - a big storm left 15,000 people without electricity, mostly in Klaipėda county.
16 January - second honorary consulate of Estonia in Lithuania was opened in the city of Kaunas.
26 January - Israel opened its embassy in Vilnius.

February
6 February - honorary consulate of India in Lithuania was opened in the capital city of Vilnius.
9 February - Aistė Diržiūtė becomes the first Lithuanian actress to win  Shooting Stars Award.
28 February - Lithuania signs a trade agreement to buy liquefied natural gas from the United States in a move aimed at reducing heavy dependence on Russian gas deliveries.

March

1 March - Municipal elections held in Lithuania with first ever direct mayoral elections held together.
18 March - Polish-Lithuanian Chamber of Commerce was established.
19 March - Lithuanian Parliament Seimas voted in favour of conscription restitution. 
20 March - NATO general Jean-Paul Palomeros has signed the NATO-Lithuanian agreement on the legal status of NATO command and control centres in Lithuania.
25 March - Lithuania's Social Democratic Prime Minister Algirdas Butkevičius opposed of proposed same-sex partnerships legalization.
29 March - archaeologists announced about the thousand-year-old grave discovery near the village of Kvietiniai, Klaipėda District Municipality.

April

9 April - Lithuania was invited to start accession talks with Organisation for Economic Co-operation and Development.
13 April - Darius Jauniškis appointed as  the head of the State Security Department.
14 April - International Monetary Fund (IMF) classified Lithuania as advanced economy.
17 April - Opened a new Honorary Consulate of Lithuania in Richmond, Virginia, United States.
23 April - Lithuania banned wearing separate elements of military uniforms and insignia in public.
28 April - Lithuania opens honorary consulate in Jeddah, Saudi Arabia.

May
4 May - Biggest stadium in the country - Žalgiris Stadium was sold for redevelopment and eventually de-establishment.
7 May - President Dalia Grybauskaitė rejected Vydas Gedvilas as candidate for education minister.
9 May - Moody‘s upgraded Lithuanian credit rating to A3.
 15 May -  district heating plant opened in Elektrėnai, that is operating on biofeuls.
 16 May - 2 Lithuanian pilots died in aviation accident when Klaipėda Avialines plane Antonov An-2 dropped down to the Baltic Sea.
 23 May - Air Lituanica, Lithuanian airline owned by the municipality of Vilnius, has announced that it is stopping operations.
 26 May - Vilnius Intermodal Terminal was opened.
 27 May - Audronė Pitrėnienė appointed as education and science minister of Lithuania.

June
1 June - Lithuanian General Consulate opened in Los Angeles, United States 
 1 June - Laima Jurevičienė appointed as country's new ambassador to the Council of Europe.
 7 June - Klaipėda Port announces start of international container distribution centre.
 9 June - cable laying works of NordBalt were completed.
 18 June - in Batumi, Minister of Foreign Affairs of Lithuania Linas Linkevičius and Minister of Foreign Affairs of Georgia Tamar Beruchashvili opened a second Honorary Consulate of Lithuania in Georgia.

Deaths

29 March - Petras Dirgėla, writer and recipient of the Lithuanian National Prize in 2003.
3 April - Algirdas Vaclovas Patackas, politician and signer of the Act of the Re-Establishment of the State of Lithuania.
6 April - Romualdas Ozolas, politician and signer of the Act of the Re-Establishment of the State of Lithuania.
6 October - Stasys Povilaitis, variety songs singer, maestro.
8 October - Galina Dauguvietytė, actor, TV director.

References

 
Lithuania
Years of the 21st century in Lithuania
2010s in Lithuania
Lithuania